Ophonus incisus is a species of ground beetle in the subfamily Harpalinae, genus Ophonus, and subgenus Ophonus (Incisophonus).

References

incisus
Beetles described in 1829